The 1989 Women's European Cricket Cup was an international cricket tournament held in Denmark from 19 to 21 July 1989. It was the first edition of the Women's European Championship, and all matches at the tournament held One Day International (ODI) status.

Four teams participated, with the hosts, Denmark, joined by the three other European members of the International Women's Cricket Council (IWCC) – England, Ireland, and the Netherlands. Denmark was making its ODI debut. The tournament was played using a round-robin format, with England finishing undefeated in its three matches. Two English players, Wendy Watson and Jo Chamberlain, led the tournament in runs and wickets, respectively. All matches were played at the Nykøbing Mors Cricket Club, located in the town of Nykøbing Mors.

Squads

Points table

Source: CricketArchive

Fixtures

Statistics

Most runs
The top five run scorers (total runs) are included in this table.

Source: CricketArchive

Most wickets

The top five wicket takers are listed in this table, listed by wickets taken and then by bowling average.

Source: CricketArchive

References

1989
International women's cricket competitions in Denmark
1989 in women's cricket
1989 in English cricket
cricket
cricket
cricket
cricket
International cricket competitions from 1988–89 to 1991
July 1989 sports events in Europe